Renato Assis da Silva (born July 26, 1983 in Colinas do Tocantins) is a former Brazilian footballer who played as a central defender.

Career 
On 22 January 2011 moved from São Paulo to Shandong Luneng.
On 4 July 2011 loan to Vasco da Gama from Shandong Luneng.

Honours
Flamengo
Copa do Brasil: 2006
Fluminense
Copa do Brasil: 2007

External links
 sambafoot
 CBF
 zerozero.pt
 placar

References

1983 births
Living people
Brazilian footballers
Brazil under-20 international footballers
Brazilian expatriate footballers
Goiás Esporte Clube players
C.F. Os Belenenses players
CR Flamengo footballers
Fluminense FC players
Botafogo de Futebol e Regatas players
São Paulo FC players
CR Vasco da Gama players
Santa Cruz Futebol Clube players
Shandong Taishan F.C. players
Chinese Super League players
Campeonato Brasileiro Série A players
Primeira Liga players
Expatriate footballers in China
Brazilian expatriate sportspeople in China
Brazilian sportspeople in doping cases
Association football defenders
Sportspeople from Tocantins